David Joel Zippel (born May 17, 1954) is an American musical theatre lyricist, director, and producer.

Early life and education
Zippel was born and raised in Easton, Pennsylvania in the Lehigh Valley region of eastern Pennsylvania. Falling in love with theater as a child, Zippel first articulated his life's ambition to become a lyricist and director in junior high school. 

As an undergraduate at the University of Pennsylvania, he contributed lyrics to an equity production of "a bizarre political musical" called Rotunda, which had a brief run in Washington, D.C. before graduating with a B.A. in 1976. Mindful of the difficulties of achieving success in theater, Zippel first obtained a J.D. degree from Harvard Law School, graduating in the class of 1979. At Harvard, Zippel continued to pursue his ambition of writing several pop songs with singer Pamala Stanley that appeared on her 1979 debut album, This Is Hot, and collaborating on three songs with Wally Harper, Barbara Cook's musical director, whose performance of the songs at  Carnegie Hall in 1980 marked Zippel's own New York theatrical debut.

Career

Theatre
As lyricist/writer
City of Angels (1989), an original musical with book by Larry Gelbart and music by Cy Coleman. Tony Award for Best Musical, Best Score, Best Book, Best Actor (James Naughton) Best Featured Actress (Randy Graff), and Best Set Design (Robin Wagner); Drama Desk Award for Outstanding Lyrics; Olivier Awards for Best New Musical (1994), Best Musical Revival (2015);  The Evening Standard Theatre Award for Best Musical (1993)
The Goodbye Girl (1993), a musical based on Neil Simon's 1977 screenplay, with music by Marvin Hamlisch. Nominated for five Tony Awards including Best Musical; Drama Desk Award nomination for Outstanding Lyrics.
Hercules (2019), an adaptation of the Disney animated film of the same name,  with music by Alan Menken.
The Woman in White (2004), an adaptation of the novel by Wilkie Collins, with music by Andrew Lloyd Webber, book by Charlotte Jones. The music and lyrics received a Tony Award nomination for Best Original Score. The show was nominated for five Laurence Olivier Awards, including Best Musical.
Liza's at the Palace (2009), script co-written with Liza Minnelli, special lyrics with music by John Kander and Billy Stritch; Tony Award for Best Special Theatrical Event (2009)
Cinderella (2020), a new adaptation of the classic story; with music by Andrew Lloyd Webber, book by Emerald Fennell
As conceiver/director
Princesses (2004), loosely inspired by A Little Princess by Frances Hodgson Burnett. Zippel conceived and directed; book by Bill and Cheri Steinkellner, music by Matthew Wilder. The musical was produced at the 5th Avenue Theatre, Seattle, Washington, in August 2005, after a "developmental"  production at Goodspeed Musicals' Norma Terris Theatre in fall 2004.
The Best Is Yet To Come: The Music of Cy Coleman, Indy Award for Best Direction (2010); Drama Desk Award for Outstanding Revue (2012)
They're Playing His Songs: The Music of Marvin Hamlisch (2013)
The Importance of Being Earnest (In New York) (2015)
As producer
Spamilton: An American Parody (2016), Gerard Alessandrini's off-Broadway spoof of Lin-Manuel Miranda's Broadway musical Hamilton, Off-Broadway Alliance Award for Best Unique Theatrical Experience (2017); MAC Award for Show of the Year (2017)

Film and television
As lyricist/writer
 Theme song for Veronica's Closet (1997), a sit-com starring Kirstie Alley

Zippel contributed lyrics to The Swan Princess (1994) and provided the singing voice of Jean-Bob the Frog. He also wrote the lyrics for the Disney films Hercules (1997), with music by Alan Menken (the song "Go the Distance" received an Academy Award nomination for Best Original Song), and Mulan (1998), with music by Matthew Wilder. The music and lyrics received an Academy Award nomination for Best Musical or Comedy Score and an Annie Award nomination for Music in an Animated Feature Production. He was in his agent Richard Kraft's film Finding Kraftland.

Pamela's First Musical, written with Coleman and Wendy Wasserstein, based on Wasserstein's children's book, received its world premiere in a concert staging at Town Hall in New York City on May 18, 2008.

In 2011, Zippel wrote the lyrics to the song "The Star-Spangled Man" featured in the film Captain America: The First Avenger. Alan Menken composed the music for the song, which was an affectionate send-up of 1940s Irving Berlin songs.

References

External links

David Zippel profile at Filmreference 

1954 births
Living people
American lyricists
American musical theatre lyricists
Animation composers
Annie Award winners
Broadway composers and lyricists
Easton Area High School alumni
University of Pennsylvania alumni
Harvard Law School alumni
Musicians from Easton, Pennsylvania
Jewish American composers
Jewish American songwriters
Songwriters from Pennsylvania
Tony Award winners
Walt Disney Animation Studios people